Fernhill Palace was the erstwhile summer residence of the Maharaja of Mysore. The first Fernhills bungalow was built in 1844 as a private residence in the hill station Ooty in the Indian state of Tamil Nadu. The palace resembles a Swiss Chalet. Its carved wooden bargeboards and ornamental cast iron give it that characteristic appearance. The palace grounds accentuate the alpine look of the place with its manicured gardens, firs and cedars. There is a church-like indoor badminton court on the grounds.

History
The first Fernhills bungalow was built in 1844 by Capt. F. Cotton. It changed hands over a period of time till mid-1860 when it was temporarily named Moonesami and served as one of Ooty's earliest country club. During the time of the British Raj, the English elite would flee the hot and muggy plains of the Madras Presidency and take sanctuary in the cool climes of Ooty, with its expanses of hills and terraced tea gardens. Its popularity never waned and has grown to include holidaymakers, honeymooners, film units and boarding schools.

Description
It is situated in the Nilgiri Hills, fringed by cardamom and tea plantations and eucalyptus forests.

References

Palaces in Tamil Nadu
Buildings and structures in Ooty
Houses completed in 1844